Naviti (pronounced ) is a volcanic island in the Yasawa Group, in the Western Division of Fiji.

The Island is covered in dense tropical dry forests, with an abundance of mangrove trees. The island has been planted greatly with coconut palm trees. Naviti has a humid, tropical climate and remains a target for tropical cyclones, the last one being Cyclone Winston in February 2016.

The first known European to visit Naviti was William Bligh in 1789, before experiencing mutiny on his ship, .

There are several villages based on Naviti Island, including Soso, Kese, Gunu, Somosomo, Marou, Muaira, Malevu, and Nasoqo. Soso is a chiefly village, which is home to the current chief or "ratu". Each village is interconnected by several trails. Naviti Island is also home to the Yasawa High School, the only high school in the Yasawa Islands, although there are kindergartens and primary schools in most villages. The main economic activity is centred on resort hotels, and several of them are found around the island. Naviti Island is also a popular base for voluntourism.

Ba Province
Islands of Fiji
Yasawa Islands